Tracy Smith (born February 14, 1966) is an American baseball coach and former player, who is the current head baseball coach of the Michigan Wolverines. He played college baseball at Miami (OH) from 1985 to 1988 for head coach Jon Pavlisko, before pursuing a professional career from 1988 to 1990. He then served as the head coach of the Miami RedHawks (1997–2005), the Indiana Hoosiers (2006–2014) and the Arizona State Sun Devils (2015–2021). 

Smith was the head coach of Indiana from 2006 to 2014, during which time the Hoosiers appeared in three NCAA Tournaments, advancing to the College World Series once.  As the head coach of Miami (OH) from 1997–2005, Smith led the RedHawks to two NCAA Tournaments.

Playing career
Smith played for South Newton High School.

Smith then played four seasons (1985–1988) of college baseball at Miami (OH).  In the 1988 MLB Draft, he was selected in the 39th round by the Chicago Cubs.  Smith played three seasons of minor league baseball in the Cubs system, advancing to Class A-Advanced before retiring following the 1990 season.

Coaching career

Early career
Early in his career, Smith was a junior college head coach and Division I assistant.  He spent two seasons (1991–1992) as the head coach of Miami–Middletown.  He then served as hitting instructor at Miami from 1993 to 1994, where he had earned a master's degree in 1992.  He moved to Indiana following the 1994 season and served as pitching coach from 1995 to 1996.

Miami
For the 1997 season, Smith returned to Miami to be the Redhawks' head coach.  He held the position from 1997 to 2005.  During Smith's tenure, Miami appeared in nine MAC Tournaments and two NCAA Tournaments (2000 and 2005).
In 2000, Miami went 1–2 as the #4 seed in the Tempe Regional, winning an elimination game against Creighton.  In 2005, they again went 1–2 as the #3 seed in the Austin Regional, defeating Quinnipiac, 35–8, in an elimination game.  Miami's 35 runs set a then-NCAA record for runs in an NCAA tournament game.

Indiana
After making a second NCAA Tournament in 2005, Smith was hired to replace Bob Morgan as head coach of Indiana.  In his third season (2008), Indiana made its first Big Ten Tournament appearance since 2003.  In 2009, Indiana won the Big Ten Tournament and appeared in the NCAA Louisville Regional, where it went 0–2.

2013 season
In 2013, the Hoosiers won the Big Ten regular season and tournament titles.  For the first time, Indiana was selected to host an NCAA Regional.  It won the regional, then won the Tallahassee Super Regional to advance to the program's first College World Series.  Smith was named the NCBWA National Coach of the Year.

Arizona State
On June 24, 2014, Smith was named head coach of Arizona State. After leading the Sun Devils to a 201–155 mark over seven years, Smith was fired after the 2021 season and replaced by Willie Bloomquist.

Michigan
On July 3, 2022, Smith was named head coach of Michigan.

Head coaching record
Below is a table of Smith's yearly records as an NCAA head baseball coach.

See also
 List of current NCAA Division I baseball coaches

References

1966 births
Living people
Arizona State Sun Devils baseball coaches
Geneva Cubs players
Indiana Hoosiers baseball coaches
Miami RedHawks baseball coaches
Miami RedHawks baseball players
Michigan Wolverines baseball coaches
Peoria Chiefs players
Winston-Salem Spirits players